K. Pratibha Bharati (born 6 February 1956) is a politician from the Indian state of Andhra Pradesh. She is a former speaker of the Andhra Pradesh Legislative Assembly (1999–2004). She was the first woman speaker in Andhra Pradesh's history. She was Minister of Social Welfare 1983, 1985 and 1994 and 1998 of Higher Education. She is a member of India Regional party named Telugu Desam.

Pratibha Bharati was born into a politically active Dalit family in Kavali in the Srikakulam district.  Her father (K. Punnaiah) and grandfather (K. Narayana) had previously served as Members of the Legislative Assembly.

References

Indian National Congress politicians from Andhra Pradesh
Living people
Speakers of the Andhra Pradesh Legislative Assembly
1956 births
Women members of the Andhra Pradesh Legislative Assembly
People from Srikakulam district
Telugu politicians
Telugu Desam Party politicians
20th-century Indian women politicians
20th-century Indian politicians
21st-century Indian women politicians
21st-century Indian politicians
People from Uttarandhra
Andhra Pradesh MLAs 1983–1985
Andhra Pradesh MLAs 1985–1989
Andhra Pradesh MLAs 1989–1994
Andhra Pradesh MLAs 1994–1999
Andhra Pradesh MLAs 1999–2004